London Tool Library (LTL) is a tool library based in London, Ontario, Canada.

History
In 2015, the LTL was cofounded by Jim Hamell under UN London's belief in the sharing resource economy, as well as supporting local environmental initiatives. The LTL held its first tool drive January 5 until March 1, 2015. The LTL motto is "Our Toolbox is Your Toolbox".

Governance
The LTL is governed by UN London's Board composed of seven citizen members who are responsible for the strategic planning, financial stability, and oversight of staff and volunteers. The Tool Committee and New Space Committee are used on both a temporary and permanent basis to meet requirements of the organization.

Services

Collections
The tool library adapted Share Starter's free "Tool Library Starter Kit"  which includes start up guidelines, frequently asked questions, and sample documents. The library uses "Local Tools" from "myTurn.com, PBC", a web-based inventory management system to track tool library members and to automatically display the tool availability online. The LTL has  367+ specialized tools from power drills and ladders to pressure washers and roto-tillers to loan to community members with all skill levels welcomed. The inventory of equipment includes automotive, bike, carpentry and woodworking, electrical and soldering, home maintenance, metalworking, plumbing, remodelling, and yard and garden. The types of equipment include: hand tools, and power tools.

Training
The LTL offers workshops open both to Tool Library members and the public on tool related skills and projects. In the Intro to Tools workshop, participants built a planter box; while in Routers 101, attendees created a cutting board.

Mission

Tool library

The Tool library performs the following main tasks:
Tool Lending: all kinds for use in volunteer projects, facility maintenance and improvement projects, community improvement events, and special events.
Tool Advocacy: for the complete and timely return of all borrowed tools, to guarantee the long-term sustainability of available inventory. Staff also seeks compensation for lost tools and tools returned late.
Tool Maintenance: performing routine maintenance and repairs on all equipment to ensure good condition and to extend the lifespan of the inventory. This function is typically performed by volunteers and community service workers.

Makerspace

Makerspace are places where people perform the following main tasks:
 to learn about technology, crafts and other kinds of making;
 to share knowledge and skills with others; and
 to apply this knowledge and skill by creating things

References

External links
Official website
UN London – official site

2015 establishments in Ontario
Non-profit organizations based in Ontario
Organizations based in London, Ontario
Tool libraries